Matthias Joseph Mehs (October 12, 1893 – April 7, 1976) was a German politician of the Christian Democratic Union (CDU) and former member of the German Bundestag.

Life 
In 1945 Mehs founded the CDU in the town and district of Wittlich, and from 1946 to 1953 he was honorary mayor of the town and member of the district council. From 1953 to 1957, he was an alderman of the town of Wittlich.

Mehs was a member of the German Bundestag in its first legislative period. He represented the constituency of Bitburg in parliament.

Literature

References

1893 births
1976 deaths
Members of the Bundestag for Rhineland-Palatinate
Members of the Bundestag 1949–1953
Members of the Bundestag for the Christian Democratic Union of Germany